Pookah Makes Three was an electronic pop music group from the United Kingdom formed in 1981. The members were Martyn Watson and Mallett (Martyn Hallett); both former members of UK indie band Lost Touch. They released four singles for the 10 Records label (later a subsidiary of Virgin), with "Take It Back" being moderately successful. The group broke up in 1986 after their fourth single "Love Can't Be Far" failed to chart.

Watson later joined Twelfth Night on bass guitar and vocals. He then became a successful talent scout, as well as working with artists including Patti Smith, The Divinyls and David Bowie. Martyn Watson died in May, 2019.

In 1989, Hallett joined Transvision Vamp on live drums.

The band's name refers to a fairy in Celtic folklore, the Púca.

Singles

Pookah Makes Three did not release an album.

References

External links
Pookah Makes Three entry at discogs.com - Discography

British electronic music groups